Diem may refer to:

Latin phrases
, a Latin phrase meaning "seize the day"
, meaning "per day"
, a legal term meaning "from day to day"

People
Diem Brown (1980–2014), American television personality and journalist
Carl Diem (1882–1962), originator of the Olympic torch relay
Ngo Dinh Diem (1901–1963), Vietnamese leader assassinated in a military coup
Ryan Diem (born 1979), American football player

Other uses
Diem (digital currency) (2019-2022), a digital currency formerly proposed by Facebook
DiEM25, Democracy in Europe Movement 2025
Diem or Didam, a town in the Netherlands

Surnames from given names